Inventure Academy is a private coeducational International School in Bangalore, India. It is located on the Whitefield-Sarjapura road on the Eastern periphery of Bangalore city and has  a campus of over 20 acres. 

Established by the India Learning Foundation in 2005, Inventure Academy offers Kindergarten to Senior Secondary (Pre K - Grade 12) education, and is affiliated to the Cambridge Assessment International Education (CAIE) – IGCSE, A/AS levels, the Council for the Indian School Certificate Examination (CISCE) – ICSE & ISC.

Management
The board of founding trustees comprises the Chairman and Co-Founder of Inventure academy, Irfan Razack, who is also the Managing Director of the Prestige Group, a reputed property development company in South India. He is also the Honorary Secretary of the Al-Ameen Educational Society. The Managing Trustee, CEO, and Co-Founder of Inventure Academy, Ms. Nooraine Fazal, holds an MBA degree from Boston University. After working with global giants like Reuters and IBM across places like Dubai, Abu Dhabi, Sydney, and Hong Kong for ten years, she came back to India to co-found Inventure Academy.   She is one of the core members of Bangalore Political Action Committee (B.PAC) along with Kiran Mazumdar-Shaw and Mohandas Pai.

In addition to the Board of Trustees, the school’s management team comprises the founding and senior members - Preet Benjamin Aarons (Head of Primary School) and Varsha Saxena (Head of Administration and Finance).

Life Skills Curriculum
Inventure Academy offers a graded life skills curriculum through its partnership with Inme Learning, with the goal of providing engaging and meaningful adventure based learning. The Inme Outclass life skills curriculum program for Inventure Academy is designed to coincide with the various development stages of students from class 4 to class 12, and help students become self-disciplined, open to exploration, learn to care about and work with others, understand the larger society, take decisions, and build a sense of leading others. The life skills programs help students interact with facilitators like Saurabh N. Saklani, author of 'What Teens Need But Can't Quite Say' and Brigadier Trigunesh Mukhejee, author of 'Inside the Indian Army'.

The school also offers outbound trips from grades 4-12 organized by INME

Beyond Academics program
In addition to classroom courses, the curriculum includes Field Trips, Workshops and Guest Lectures in the field of Leadership, Sustainable Technology, Climate Change, Career Counseling, etc. Inventure Academy also encourages Theater as part of the School’s Curriculum.

Students of Inventure Academy have had Guest Lectures from personalities like Kapil Dev, Madhav Das Nalapat, Zai Whitaker, Gerry Martin and Srikanth Nadhamuni, and have gone on trips to Lalbagh, a gasification plant, Foundation for the Revitalization of Local Health Traditions and Indian Institute of Science, Intel, Navadarshanam.

In April 2013, the 9 year olds of Inventure Academy raised funds to adopt a tiger at the Bannerghatta National Park.

Inventure Academy also has a unique concept called "Inventuring", where the first week of a new school year is spent by all students and faculty doing multiple activities (e.g. building a climbing wall, creating wooden benches for the school park, etc.) which fosters bonding amongst the new batch.

Inventure Academy is an active supporter of the Model United Nations (MUN) platform and its students have been active participants in such events.

References

Cambridge schools in India
International schools in Bangalore
Educational institutions established in 2005
2005 establishments in Karnataka